Chaul is a historic town located in the Raigad district of Maharashtra, India. The Korlai Fort is located nearby.

History

Many foreign writers have mentioned Chaul- Ptolemy in his Geography of India calls the town as Symullla or Timulla. The Periplus of the Erythraean Sea mentions that it was a market south of Kalliena (Calliana).
The Portuguese arrived at Chaul in 1505 and established a factory in 1516. The city was then looted by the troops of the Bijapur Sultanate in 1521, the Gujarat Sultanate in 1529 and finally passed to the Mughal Empire in 1600.

The town was famous for cotton manufactured goods in the 15th and 16th century, According to Varthema, Chaul was producing a lot of cotton stuffs. Even Portuguese explorer and writer Duarte Barbosa conceded fame of the Chaul for cotton materials.

The city went into the hands of the Maratha Empire in 1740, being ruled by the Angre family and then was conquered from them by the British EIC.

See also
 Battle of Diu
 Revdanda

References

External links
 The Portuguese Fort of Chaul, India
 Chaul, a historical port

Former Portuguese colonies
Populated places established in 1521
Cities and towns in Raigad district
1521 establishments in the Portuguese Empire